Luiz Zech (born 20 September 1949) is a Brazilian volleyball player. He competed in the men's tournament at the 1972 Summer Olympics.

References

1949 births
Living people
Brazilian men's volleyball players
Olympic volleyball players of Brazil
Volleyball players at the 1972 Summer Olympics
Sportspeople from Belo Horizonte
20th-century Brazilian people